Jo, jo, JO, or J.O. may refer to:

Arts and entertainment
 Jo (film), a 1972 French comedy
 Jo (TV series), a French TV series
"Jo", a song by Goldfrapp from Tales of Us
"Jo", a song by Mr. Oizo from Lambs Anger
 Jo a fictional character in the Star Wars franchise

People
 Jo (given name)
 Jô, Brazilian footballer João Alves de Assis Silva (born 1987)
 Josiel Alves de Oliveira (born 1988), Brazilian footballer also known as Jô
 Jō (surname), a Japanese surname
 Cho (Korean name), a common Korean surname which can be romanized as Jo

Codes
 JO, ISO 3166 country code for Jordan
 .jo, the Internet country code top-level domain for Jordan
 JO, IATA code for JALways, a subsidiary of Japan Airlines

Other uses
 jō, a wooden staff used in some Japanese martial arts
 jō, a Japanese unit of length equivalent to the Chinese zhang
 jō, a Japanese unit of area corresponding to the area of a standard tatami mat (1×½ ken or 18 square Japanese feet)
JO, U.S. Navy rating-abbreviation for "journalist"
 Journal Officiel de la République Française, the official gazette of the Government of France
Jo, a Vodun (deity) in the Fon pantheon.
Jo language, a Duala language
Ё, a letter of the Cyrillic alphabet

See also 
 Joe (disambiguation)
 Jojo (disambiguation)